The 2009 World Judo Cadets Championships is an edition of the World Judo Cadets Championships, organised by the International Judo Federation. It was held in Budapest, Hungary from 6 to 9 August 2009.

Medal summary

Medal table

Men's events

Women's events

Source Results

References

External links
 

World Judo Cadets Championships
World Championships, U18
Judo
World 2009
Judo
Judo, World Championships U18